Gridinskaya is the name of several rural localities in Russia:
Gridinskaya, Velsky District, Arkhangelsk Oblast, a selo in Khozminskoye Rural Settlement of Verkhnetoyemsky District, Arkhangelsk Oblast
Gridinskaya, Vinogradovsky District, Arkhangelsk Oblast, a selo in Boretskoye Rural Settlement of Vinogradovsky District, Arkhangelsk Oblast